The Order of Saint Joseph was instituted on 9 March 1807 by Ferdinand III, Grand Duke of Tuscany during his reign as Grand Duke of Würzburg. It was transformed into a Tuscan Roman Catholic Dynastic Order in 1817.

The constitution of the Order was promulgated in March 1817, with amendments in August 1817. The order was divided into civil and military categories but these are now defunct. It is given to reward services towards Tuscan culture and civilisation and to the Grand Ducal House as a whole.
The Order is divided into three levels:
 Knights Grand Cross, numbering thirty
 Commander, numbering sixty
 Knights, numbering one hundred and fifty

These numbers excluded Sovereigns, Heads of State, and Princes of the Grand Ducal House and other Royal Houses, Cardinals of the Holy Roman Church and Tuscan Metropolitan Archbishops. All had to be Catholics. The number of women members cannot exceed fifty, excluding Princesses of the Grand Ducal and other Royal Houses, wives of Heads of State and Dames of the Order of Saint Stephen.
It is permitted for non-nobles to be admitted into the Order of the level of Grand Cross in cases of exceptional merit.
Dames wear the same Cross as Knights but from a bow on the left breast. Dame Grand Crosses wear the Cross hanging from a Riband like the Knights but without the Star.

Recipients 

 Grand Masters
 Ferdinand III, Grand Duke of Tuscany
 Ferdinand IV, Grand Duke of Tuscany
 Archduke Gottfried of Austria
 Archduke Joseph Ferdinand of Austria
 Archduke Leopold Franz of Austria
 Leopold II, Grand Duke of Tuscany
 Commanders
 Vincenzo Antinori
 Luigi Federico Menabrea
 Knights
 Giovanni Battista Amici
 Felice Pasquale Baciocchi
 Gino Capponi
 Jean-François Champollion
 Pavel Nikolaievich Demidov
 Anatoly Nikolaievich Demidov, 1st Prince of San Donato
 Giovanni Dupré
 Alphonse de Lamartine
 Maximilian II of Bavaria
 Philipp Albrecht, Duke of Württemberg
 Bettino Ricasoli
 Federico Sclopis
 Federico Sclopis

Bibliography
 Gregor Gatscher-Riedl, Mario Strigl, Die roten Ritter. Zwischen Medici, Habsburgern und Osmanen. Die Orden und Auszeichnungen des Großherzogtums Toskana. Vienna, Neue Welt Verlag, 2014. .

External links
 Grand Dukedom of Tuscany Dynastic Orders
 ORDER OF SAINT JOSEPH

 
Awards established in 1807